Juliet Winters Carpenter (born 1948) is an American translator of modern Japanese literature. Born in the American Midwest, she studied Japanese literature at the University of Michigan and the Inter-University Center for Japanese Language Studies in Tokyo. After completing her graduate studies in 1973, she returned to Japan in 1975, where she became involved in translation efforts and teaching.

Carpenter is a devotee of traditional Japanese music and is a licensed instructor of the koto and shamisen. She is professor emeritus at  Doshisha Women's College of Liberal Arts in Kyoto and has been involved in the Japanese Literature Publishing Project(JLPP), a government-supported project translating and publishing Japanese books overseas.

Carpenter retired to Whidbey Island in Washington State with her husband Bruce, professor emeritus of Tezukayama University. They have three children: Matthew Edwin Carpenter, Graham, and Mark.

Carpenter's translation of Abe Kobo's novel Secret Rendezvous (Mikkai in Japanese) won the 1980 Japan-U.S. Friendship Commission Prize for the Translation of Japanese Literature. Her translation of Minae Mizumura's novel Honkaku Shosetsu, "A True Novel," won that same award for 2014-2015 and earned numerous other awards including the 2014 Lewis Galantière Award of the American Translators Association.
Once Upon a Time in Japan, a book of folk tales which she co-translated with Roger Pulvers, received the 2015 Gelett Burgess Children's Book Award for Best Multicultural Book.

Carpenter won the 2021-2022 Lindsey and Masao Miyoshi Translation Prize for a lifetime achievement as a translator of modern Japanese literature, with particular reference to her recent translation of Mizumura Minae’s An I-Novel (Columbia University Press, 2021)

An I-Novel, translated by Carpenter, won the 2019-20 William F. Sibley Memorial Subvention Award for Japanese Translation.

Her translation of The Great Passage by Miura Shion, an audio Book read by Brian Nishii, won the 2017 Golden Earphones Award.

Selected works

Translations

Other works 
Carpenter is also the author of the book Seeing Kyoto.

References
 Televised nostalgia in Japan: Those were the days 
 A translator's work from Abe to Zen/Professor continues wide-ranging literary pursuits with epic novel by Ryotaro Shiba
  The Asian Bookshelf by Donald Richie: Blood, sweat and tears of Zen 
 Strange Moors: 'A True Novel,' by Minae Mizumura

1948 births
Living people
American speculative fiction translators
Japanese–English translators
American expatriates in Japan
Koto players
University of Michigan College of Literature, Science, and the Arts alumni
Japanese literature academics
American women writers
20th-century American translators
21st-century American translators
20th-century American women
21st-century American women